Ehn is a surname, and may refer to:

 Anna Ehn (born 1931), Austrian designated one of the Righteous Among the Nations
 Christoffer Ehn (born 1996), Swedish ice hockey player
 Erik Ehn, American playwright and director
 Karl Ehn (1884–1957), Viennese architect and city planner
 Tina Ehn (born 1960), Swedish Green Party politician